Cody Robert Simpson (born 11 January 1997) is an Australian swimmer, actor and singer-songwriter. Since his debut, he has released four solo studio albums: Paradise (2012), Surfers Paradise (2013), Free (2015), and Cody Simpson (2022). He portrayed the lead role of Dmitry in the Broadway musical Anastasia from November 2018 through April 2019. The same year, he won the first season of The Masked Singer Australia as "Robot".

In 2022, Simpson joined the Australian Swim Team after qualifying for the Commonwealth Games during Australia's team trials.

Early life
Simpson was born in Benowa, a suburb on the Gold Coast, Queensland, to parents Brad and Angie. He has two younger siblings, Alli and Tom. Growing up, Simpson attended All Saints Anglican School. In 2009, Simpson began uploading songs to YouTube, performing covers of Jason Mraz's "I'm Yours", Cry Me a River" by Justin Timberlake, "I Want You Back" by The Jackson 5 and Bon Jovi's "Wanted Dead or Alive".

Career

Music career

2009–2011: Career beginnings, 4 U, and Coast to Coast

Simpson's rise to recognition was featured on The 7.30 Report in December 2009. He released his debut single, "iYiYi" (which features American rapper Flo Rida), on 15 May 2010. The music video for Simpson's second single, "Summertime", was released on 20 September 2010. Simpson relocated to Los Angeles in June 2010 with his family to record his songs with Atlantic Records' Shawn Campbell. That same month, Simpson appeared on Sunrise. On 22 June 2010, it was announced that Simpson would participate in the Camplified 2010 Tour, along with other artists, touring across the United States. The tour began on 5 July 2010 and ended on 14 August 2010. Other tours that year included a middle school tour that took place from October–November 2010 and covered 9 U.S states. An EP, 4 U was released on 21 December 2010. The EP included five tracks in total, four of them being previously unreleased. Simpson recorded a remake of the song "I Want Candy" by The Strangeloves as the main theme song for the Easter-themed live-action/CGI-animated film Hop. In May 2011, Simpson was "egged" during a live performance at Westfield Miranda in Sydney. Simpson told Australian radio show The Kyle & Jackie O Show that he was not in fact hit by the eggs, and that he was upset on behalf of his fans as the remainder of his show was cancelled due to security concerns. He then started the Waiting 4U tour with American singer Greyson Chance on 9 April in Ivins, Utah. The tour ended on 18 May 2011, in Portland, Oregon.

Coast to Coast was released on 20 September 2011 by Atlantic Records. It reached number 12 on the Billboard 200 and sold 24,000 copies. On 23 April 2011, Simpson released the single "On My Mind". On 5 August 2011, he performed on The Today Show. The following day, Simpson started his Coast to Coast Mall Tour in Lake Grove, New York to promote his second EP. He played nine dates around the United States and finished it in Orange, California on 18 September 2011. On 22 September, it was announced that Cody Simpson hired Justin Bieber's manager, Scooter Braun, as his own.

2012–2014: Paradise, Surfers Paradise and Dancing with the Stars

On 12 June 2012, Simpson released an EP titled Preview to Paradise containing four songs from his upcoming debut studio album, Paradise, which was released on 2 October 2012. In February 2013, Simpson toured Europe, doing his own tour dates as well as supporting Justin Bieber on many of the European Believe tour dates. Surfers Paradise, which was released on 16 July 2013, is Simpson's first album to debut in the top 10 of the Billboard 200.
During the summer of 2013, Simpson headlined the Paradise Tour, featuring opening acts Ryan Beatty and Before You Exit.
On 19 November 2013, Simpson released an acoustic album called The Acoustic Sessions, featuring the songs "Pretty Brown Eyes", "All Day", "La Da Dee", "Wish U Were Here", and a cover of "Please Come Home for Christmas" recorded acoustically.

On 4 March 2014, Simpson was announced as one of the celebrities to participate on the 18th season of Dancing with the Stars during ABC's Good Morning America. He was partnered with professional dancer Witney Carson. He was eliminated on Week 5 of the competition and finished in ninth place.

From 30 June 2014 to 14 July 2014 Simpson did an acoustic tour through Europe with singer Jackson Harris.

In August 2014 Simpson announced he had departed Warner/Atlantic. He cited creative differences as the reason for his departure and as a result, is currently unsigned.

2015–2018: Free, Cody Simpson and the Tide, and Wave One
Simpson's album Free was scheduled to be released on 23 June 2015 then was pushed back to 10 July. Simpson performed the first single, "Flower" on Good Morning America on 6 February 2015. It is his first album as an independent artist since leaving Atlantic Records to create his own label, Coast House. The album was produced by Cisco Adler and includes songwriting collaborations with G. Love and Donavon Frankenreiter. John Mayer served as a sounding board. Cody performed his single "New Problems" on NBC's Today show on 13 July 2015. On 1 November 2015 it has been reported that Cody took a break from his long term solo career to start up a new band with his close mates Adrian Cota and Khari Mateen.

In 2017, Simpson formed a new band billed as Cody Simpson and the Tide, making their debut with the single "Waiting for the Tide". Cody and the Tide is composed of Cody Simpson on vocals and guitar, Adrian Cota on drums and Shareef "Reef" Addo on bass.
Cody and the Tide released their debut EP, entitled Wave One, in the fall of 2017. The music is a blend of pop, rock, blues, and surf-rock genres. The band used their varying influences and musical tastes to create Wave One. In their four-track EP, Simpson sings of love, unity, environmentalism and ocean conservation. The EP's debut single, "Waiting for the Tide", was inspired by a poem Simpson wrote that tackled topics such as rising water levels and ocean conservation. In August 2018, the band released "Underwater" music video song. In October, Cody and the Tide went on a short tour of southern California to perform their EP. In early 2019, after almost three years together, the band split up.

2019–present: Return to solo work
After parting ways with his band and focusing on his solo career again, Simpson released the song Golden Thing he wrote for Miley Cyrus on 18 October 2019 which crossed over 49 million streams on Spotify. In the same year, he participated on The Masked Singer Australia, as the "Robot" and went on to win the show. In April 2022, Simpson released a self-titled album, his first in six years, which he had recorded during a swimming training break in 2020. Simpson also released music videos for singles "Nice To Meet You", and "Let Go" on YouTube and Spotify. In November, Simpson performed the Australian National Anthem at the Lexus Melbourne Cup and the AFL Women's Grand Final. Simpson performed a rendition of the Nat King Cole song "The Christmas Song" at the 85th annual Carols by Candlelight held in Melbourne in December 2022.

Acting career
In 2014, Simpson made his television debut guest starring as himself in the sitcom Instant Mom. In 2015, he guest starred on the American television sitcom Cougar Town, portraying Pete, a high school student. In the same year, he booked a role in the Nickelodeon film One Crazy Cruise where he played the love interest of Kira Kosarin's character Ellie Jensen-Bauer and starred as himself. In late 2017, Simpson was cast in a supporting role in Bret Easton Ellis' thriller film, Smiley Face Killers, opposite actor Crispin Glover. In October 2018, Simpson made his Broadway musical debut when he was cast as male lead Dmitry in Anastasia, alongside John Bolton and Christy Altomare.

Swimming career

Junior swimming
Simpson was a talented swimmer in his junior years. He trained at the Miami Swimming Club under coach Ken Nixon and won two gold medals at the 2009 Queensland Swimming Championships.

Return to swimming
In 2019, Simpson turned his focus from music back onto competitive swimming, joining the University of Southern California's Trojan Swim Elite team under coach Dave Salo. In October 2019, Simpson, who was competing at his first meet in nearly a decade, finished the 100 yard butterfly in 24th position out of 29 entrants with a time of 51.51. To improve his swimming technique, he trained under different coaches including two-time Olympian Brett Hawke. In December 2020, Simpson shared on social media that he had qualified for the Australian Olympic trials in the 100 metre butterfly, after having raced a time of 54.90.

Simpson starred in swimming documentary Head Above Water, which highlighted his return to swimming and was released 4 June 2021 on Amazon Prime Video.

In February 2023, Simpson alongside Griffith University Swimming Club teammates Mack Horton, Bowen Gough and Josh Edwards-Smith competed in the Rottnest Channel Swim finishing first in a time of 3:33:49 and setting a new team record.

2021 Australian Swimming Trials
Simpson continued to show improvement in the lead up to the 2021 Australian Swimming Trials which took place in Adelaide, South Australia in June 2021. At the meet, Simpson swam a personal best time of 50.22 in the 100 metre freestyle, however failed to advance through to the finals. In the 100 metre butterfly, Simpson swam a time of 52.84 in the preliminary heats to qualify sixth and advance through to the final. In the final, Simpson failed to qualify for the Tokyo Olympics after finishing in eighth place with a time of 52.94.

Shortly after the trials, Simpson announced he had been training under coach Michael Bohl at Griffith University, having moved back to Australia in the lead up to the trials.

2022 Australian Swimming Championships
Simpson participated in the Australian Swimming Championships which took place in Adelaide, South Australia in May 2022. In the 100 metre butterfly, Simpson advanced through to the finals after qualifying second in the preliminary heats with a time of 51.79. In the final, he swam a 51.96 to place third, and initially it was thought Simpson had qualified for the 2022 World Aquatics Championships in Budapest, Hungary, as Kyle Chalmers was not going to swim, however Chalmers later backflipped on his decision which ultimately pushed Simpson out of the team. In the 50 metre butterfly, Simpson swam a time of 23.79 in the preliminary heats to qualify fifth and advance through to the final, where he finished in fourth place with a time of 23.68. Simpson also swam in the 100 metre freestyle, swimming a time of 49.43, however he was disqualified after a false start. The disqualification was overturned on protest, and Simpson advanced into the final, finishing eighth with a time of 49.34.

2022 Commonwealth Games
Simpson was selected for the 2022 Commonwealth Games in Birmingham, England on 22 May 2022. In the wake of Isaac Cooper being sent home from the Games, Simpson was selected to swim in the 50 metre butterfly on the first day of competition. He swam a 23.84 in the preliminary heats to qualify in tenth fastest for the semifinal, however failed to advance into the final after finishing in 14th place with a time of 23.87. Simpson was part of the 4 × 100 metre freestyle relay, swimming the second leg in the heats. His 48.86 split time helped Australia into the final, where they earned a gold medal. In the 100 metre butterfly, Simpson advanced through to the semifinals after qualifying fifth in the preliminary heats with a time of 52.47. In the semifinal, he swam a time of 52.16, placing fifth and making it through to the final, where he again placed fifth, swimming a time of 52.06. Simpson was also part of the 4 × 100 metre medley relay, swimming a 51.49 split for the butterfly leg. His efforts helped Australia advance to the finals, where they picked up a silver medal.

2022 Australian Short Course Championships
At the Australian Short Course Swimming Championships held in Sydney, New South Wales in August 2022, Simpson entered five events. In the 50 metre butterfly, he swam a 23.13 in the preliminary heats to qualify third and make it through to the final where he placed fourth with a time of 23.06. In the 100 metre freestyle, Simpson swam a time of 47.89 in the preliminary heats, but failed to advance into the final after placing 12th. Simpson qualified third in the 100 metre butterfly preliminary heats with a time of 51.15, making it through to the final where he finished fourth in a time of 50.46. In the 50 metre freestyle, Simpson qualified eighth in the preliminary heats with a time of 21.88 to advanced through to the finals where he swam a 21.67 to finish in seventh place. Simpson also competed in the 100 metre individual medley, qualifying third in the preliminary heats with a time of 53.56. In the finals, he swam a 52.67 to finish second behind American Grant House, however as the first Australian to finish, Simpson earned himself a gold medal.

Other works
In 2012, Simpson was a brand ambassador of Build-A-Bear Workshop. A year later, he became a brand ambassador for Teen Cancer America. In June 2017, he was named the first United Nations Development Programme advocate for oceans. In the month of August, he was named one of Bonds brand ambassador for Home Grown campaign. He also featured in Stellar. He is signed with IMG Models. In February 2020, Simpson appeared in Australia's new Bonds "WeGotsYou" campaign. He released a book of poetry titled, Prince Neptune in April 2020. In August 2020, Simpson signed with talent agency ICM Partners. In 2021, he teamed up with Myer for their spring fashion ad campaign, and in May 2022, he was named the face of their High Winter campaign. In July, he signed a multi-year sponsorship deal with the Australian swimwear brand, Speedo. Simpson founded his own sustainable clothing line, Prince Neptune: The Label, which launched online in August.

Personal life
Simpson currently has 17 tattoos inked on his body, including: his record label, which represents the sun, water, and earth, on his left forearm; a large anchor on his right hand; a large sun below his right shoulder; 'Old man river' on his arm; skull and crossbones inked on his chest; and a thumb-sized drawing of Elvis Presley on his forearm.

Simpson's first relationship was with Kylie Jenner, who he dated in 2011. He later dated Gigi Hadid from 2013 to May 2015. In October 2019, Simpson started dating Miley Cyrus before the pair split in August 2020. He then dated Belgian-American model, Marloes Stevens from December 2020 to January 2022. In July 2022, Simpson confirmed he was dating fellow Australian swimmer, Emma McKeon.

Filmography

Discography

Studio albums
Paradise (2012)
Surfers Paradise (2013)
Free (2015)
Cody Simpson (2022)

Tours
Headlining
Welcome to Paradise Tour (2012)
Paradise Tour  (2013–14)
The Acoustic Sessions Tour (2014)
Free Tour (2015)

Co-headlining
Waiting 4U Tour  (2011)

Promotional
Coast to Coast Mall Tour (2011)

Opening act
Big Time Summer Tour  (2012)
Believe Tour  (2012-13)

Awards and nominations

References

External links

 
 
 

 
1997 births
21st-century Australian male actors
21st-century Australian singers
Atlantic Records artists
Masked Singer winners
Australian expatriates in the United States
Australian contemporary R&B singers
Australian male dancers
Australian male models
Australian male singers
Australian male singer-songwriters
Australian pop singers
IMG Models models
Living people
Musicians from Gold Coast, Queensland
Sportspeople from the Gold Coast, Queensland
Australian male butterfly swimmers
Child pop musicians
Australian child singers
Australian male swimmers
Swimmers at the 2022 Commonwealth Games
Commonwealth Games medallists in swimming
Commonwealth Games gold medallists for Australia
Commonwealth Games silver medallists for Australia
Medallists at the 2022 Commonwealth Games